Felisa Rincón de Gautier (also known as Doña Fela; January 9, 1897 – September 16, 1994) was a Puerto Rican politician who served as the mayor of the city of San Juan, Puerto Rico. She was the first woman to be elected as mayor of a capital city in the Americas.

Early years
Rincón de Gautier was born on January 9, 1897, in Ceiba, Puerto Rico. The oldest of all siblings (Felisa, Josefina, Cecilia, Esilda, Ramón, Rafael, Enrique and Rita), she was politically influenced by her father, attorney Enrique Rincón Plumey, family of an earlier Mayor of Yabucoa. Her mother, teacher Rita Marrero Rivera, died when she was around 11 years old. However, her father was determined to give her the best education possible. She went to school in Fajardo, Humacao and Santurce although she did not graduate from high school; in the summers she visited her uncle in San Lorenzo where she learned how to prepare medications pharmacy and became a pharmacist. 
Of Spanish descent; her direct paternal grandfather Francisco Rincón Martín came from Salamanca, Spain.

After her mother died, her father married Mercedes Acha, the mother of her half brother Manuel. Felisa ran the household and raised her younger brothers and sisters.

In the early 20th Century, "there was no welfare on the island; no social department to provide money or clothing or food for the poor (but) no jíbaro would let another jíbaro starve. This was the most important truth she learned. The jíbaros were a people steeped in tradition, the noblest of which was their hospitality" (Ruth Gruber, Felisa Rincon de Gautier: The Mayor of San Juan).

An expert seamstress, Felisa set herself the goal of creating employment in Puerto Rico by launching a local clothing factory. In order to master necessary skills she worked for two years in New York City during the Great Depression, living with relatives, including her sister Josefina.

Upon her return to San Juan, she entered the wholesale/retail business and opened Felisa's Style Shop on Calle Fortaleza in Old San Juan. She also managed a flower shop called Miles de Flores. Throughout her lifetime, she remained closely tied to the Roman Catholic Church as she directed her efforts to raising the standards of living for impoverished Puerto Ricans.

Women's rights activist
Rincón de Gautier was a firm believer in the women's right to vote and was an active participant in the suffragist movement, motivating many women to register. When the law allowing women to vote was passed, Rincón de Gautier was the fifth woman to officially register.  In 1932, she joined the Liberal Party of Puerto Rico, which believed in Puerto Rico's independence, and was named representative by the party's president Antonio R. Barceló. Motivated by the political ideas of Luis Muñoz Marín, she left the Liberal Party and in 1938 helped organize the Popular Democratic Party of Puerto Rico.

Marriage and family

In 1940, Rincón de Gautier married the San Juan lawyer Genaro A. Gautier, who served as the Assistant Attorney General of Puerto Rico and Secretary General of the Popular Democratic Party. They had no children.

Political career

In 1946, she was elected mayor of San Juan - the first woman mayor of a capital city in the Americas. Under her leadership, San Juan was transformed into a Latin-American urban center. Rincón de Gautier designed innovative public services and established the first preschool centers called "Las Escuelas Maternales", which would eventually become the model for the Head Start programs in the United States. She also renovated the public health system and was responsible for the establishment of the School of Medicine in San Juan.

Rincón worked with Ricardo Alegría to restore and conserve the historical structures of Old San Juan and provided housing and basic services to thousands of people. In 1951, during the Cold War era, she ordered the establishment of the island's first Civil Defense system which was under the directorship of Colonel Gilberto José Marxuach. She often opened City Hall to the public and listened to concerns of the residents of the city. In 1959, San Juan was awarded the All American City Award.

Rincón de Gautier started a Christmas tradition, which would be continued every year by the governors of Puerto Rico. On the Día de los Reyes (Three Kings Day), celebrated on January 6, she would bring gifts and treats to the poor and needy children.  In 1952, 1953 and 1954, she had plane loads of snow delivered to San Juan so that the children who had never seen or played in snow would be able to do so.

Later years
Rincón was mayor of San Juan for 22 years, from 1946 to 1968. Upon retiring, she served as the American Goodwill Ambassador for four United States Presidents. She served in Latin America, Asia, and Europe promoting friendship between those regions and the United States. When Felisa Rincón de Gautier died in San Juan, aged 97, on September 16, 1994, she was given the burial honors of a head of state. Dignitaries from all over the world attended her funeral service. Felisa Rincón de Gautier was buried at the Capital Municipal Cemetery in Río Piedras, Puerto Rico.

Honors
In both Puerto Rico and the United States, numerous public structures and avenues have been named in honor of Rincón de Gautier. There is a Felisa Rincón de Gautier Museum and a parking lot with the name of Doña Fela on Calle Recinto Sur in Old San Juan. In New York City, both the Felisa Rincón de Gautier Institute for Law & Public Policy in the Bronx and a public school (PS 376) in Brooklyn, New York, are named in her honor.

On May 29, 2014, The Legislative Assembly of Puerto Rico honored 12 illustrious women with plaques in the "La Plaza en Honor a la Mujer Puertorriqueña" (Plaza in Honor of Puerto Rican Women) in San Juan. According to the plaques the 12 women, who by virtue of their merits and legacies, stand out in the history of Puerto Rico. Rincón de Gautier was among those who were honored.

In 2019, Felisa Rincón de Gautier was highlighted by MSNBC for her outstanding political and humanitarian accomplishments as a notable American.

On March 14, 2019, The Puerto Rican Arts Alliance (PRAA) honored Felisa Rincón de Gautier with the Distinguished Woman award.

Dona Felisa received recognition from multiple governments such as France (Medal of Joan of Arc), Spain (Gold Medal of Honor), and Ecuador (Gold Medal of Honor).

Ancestry

See also

List of mayors of San Juan, Puerto Rico
List of Puerto Ricans
History of women in Puerto Rico

Notes

References

Further reading

External links
El Nuevo Dia

1897 births
1994 deaths
People from Ceiba, Puerto Rico
Popular Democratic Party (Puerto Rico) politicians
Mayors of San Juan, Puerto Rico
Puerto Rican suffragists
Puerto Rican activists
Puerto Rican women in politics
Puerto Rican Roman Catholics
Women mayors of places in Puerto Rico
20th-century Puerto Rican businesspeople
Puerto Rican feminists
20th-century American politicians
20th-century American women politicians